Scopula hackeri is a moth of the family Geometridae. It is found in Yemen.

References

Moths described in 1999
hackeri
Moths of Asia